is the third studio album by Japanese rock band Asian Kung-Fu Generation, released on March 15, 2006. The album peaked at number three on Oricon charts and sold 253,137 copies by year's end, eventually becoming the 48th album of the year. The album included two singles, "Blue Train," which reached number five on the charts, and "World Apart," which earned the band their first number-one single.

Title meaning
The album title "fanclub" is derived from the members' disposition toward creativity, their desire to be devoted followers not only of rock, but every type of music and its unique aspects and capabilities. The title also reflects their wish for people to love and live with the music in everyday life.

Track listing 
All songs written and composed by Masafumi Gotō, except:
"Blue Train," composed by Masafumi Gotō and Kensuke Kita.
The piano intro in "Moonlight" is from Claude Debussy's Suite bergamasque (specifically Clair de Lune).

B-sides

Personnel

Masafumi Gotō – lead vocals, guitar, lyrics
Kensuke Kita – lead guitar, background vocals
Takahiro Yamada –  bass, background vocals
Kiyoshi Ijichi – drums, percussion, piano
Asian Kung-Fu Generation – producer

Kenichi Nakamura – mixing, recording
Tofu Takayama – mixing, recording
Yuya Suzuki – recording
George Marino – mastering
Yusuke Nakamura – art direction

Chart positions

Album

Singles

References

External links
 CDJapan
 Fanclub at MusicBrainz
 Fanclub at Last.fm

Asian Kung-Fu Generation albums
2006 albums
Japanese-language albums
Sony Music albums